Hayfield may refer to: 

 A field used to grow grasses for hay

Places
 Hayfield, Alberta, Canada
United Kingdom
 Hayfield, Derbyshire, a village and civil parish in Derbyshire, England
 Hayfield, Fife, a location in Scotland
 Hayfield Road, Oxford, England

United States
 Hayfield, Iowa, an unincorporated community
 Hayfield Junction, Iowa, an unincorporated community
 Hayfield, Minnesota, a city in Dodge County
 Hayfield, Fairfax County, Virginia
 Hayfield, Frederick County, Virginia
 Hayfield Dundee, Louisville, a neighborhood in eastern Louisville, Kentucky  
 Hayfield Secondary School, the oldest secondary school in the Fairfax County Public Schools system of Virginia
 Hayfield Township, Crawford County, Pennsylvania
 Hayfield Township, Dodge County, Minnesota

People with the surname
 Andrew Osborne Hayfield (1905–1981), American businessman and politician
 Matt Hayfield (born 1975), English footballer
 Nancy Hayfield, American author, editor and publisher

Others
 The Hayfield Fight, an 1867 engagement of Red Cloud's War, between troops of the U.S. Army and Native American warriors
 Hemizonia congesta, a species of flowering plant in the daisy family commonly known by the name hayfield tarweed